Henry Charles Keith Petty-Fitzmaurice, 5th Marquess of Lansdowne,  (14 January 18453 June 1927), was a British statesman who served successively as Governor General of Canada, Viceroy of India, Secretary of State for War and Secretary of State for Foreign Affairs.

In 1917, during the First World War, he wrote the "Lansdowne Letter", advocating in vain a compromise peace. A millionaire, he had the distinction of having held senior positions in Liberal and Conservative Party governments.

Early years, 1845–1882
A great-grandson of British Prime Minister Lord Shelburne (later 1st Marquess of Lansdowne) and the eldest son of Henry Petty-Fitzmaurice, 4th Marquess of Lansdowne, and his wife, Emily, 8th Lady Nairne (née de Flahaut), Henry Charles Keith Petty-Fitzmaurice was born in London in 1845. His maternal grandfather, Count Charles de Flahaut, was an important French general of Napoleon Bonaparte who fought along his side during many battles, and later occupied the functions of Ambassador and Senator of the Empire. Through his mother Emily, he was also a half-nephew of Emperor Napoleon III, a step-grandson of Queen Hortense Bonaparte, and a great-grandson of Talleyrand.  

Lord Lansdowne was a member of the Fitzmaurice/Petty-Fitzmaurice family, a cadet branch of the House of FitzGerald of Ireland. He held the courtesy title Viscount Clanmaurice from birth to 1863 and then the courtesy title Earl of Kerry until he succeeded as Marquess of Lansdowne in 1866. Upon his mother's death in 1895, he succeeded her as the 9th Lord Nairne in the Peerage of Scotland.

After studying at Eton and Oxford, he succeeded his father as 5th Marquess of Lansdowne (in the Peerage of the United Kingdom) and 6th Earl of Kerry (in the Peerage of Ireland) at the relatively early age of 21 on 5 June 1866. He  inherited a vast estate (including Bowood House, a Wiltshire estate of over 121,000 acres) and great wealth. At one of his inherited properties, Derreen House (Lauragh, County Kerry, in the present-day Republic of Ireland), Lord Lansdowne started to develop a great garden from 1871 onwards. For most of the rest of his life, he spent three months of the year at Derreen.

Lord Lansdowne entered the House of Lords as a member of the Liberal Party in 1866. He served in William Ewart Gladstone's government as a Lord of the Treasury from 1869 to 1872 and as Under-Secretary of State for War from 1872 to 1874. He was appointed Under-Secretary of State for India in 1880 and, having gained experience in overseas administration, was appointed Governor General of Canada in 1883, replacing John Campbell, 9th Duke of Argyll, the son-in-law of Queen Victoria. The present-day town of Lansdowne, in Uttarakhand, India, was established in 1887 and named after him.

Governor General of Canada, 1883–1888
Lord Lansdowne was Governor General during turbulent times in Canada. His Protestant Irish connections made him unpopular with the Catholic Irish element. Prime Minister Sir John A. Macdonald's government was in its second term and facing allegations of scandal over the building of the railway (the Pacific Scandal), and the economy was once again sliding into recession. The North-West Rebellion of 1885 and the controversy caused by its leader, Louis Riel, posed a serious threat to the equilibrium of Canadian politics. To calm the situation, he travelled extensively throughout Western Canada in 1885 and met many of Canada's First Nations peoples. He publicly objected to the treatment of the Indigenous by Indian Agents, and supported Chiefs Crowfoot and Poundmaker. His experiences in Western Canada gave Lansdowne a great love of the Canadian outdoors and the physical beauty of Canada. He was an avid fisherman and was intensely interested in winter sports. His love of the wilderness and the Canadian countryside led him to purchase a second residence (first Cascapedia House, built in 1880, later renamed Lorne Cottage, and then New Dereen Camp, built in 1884) on the Cascapédia River in the Gaspé Peninsula, Quebec. The same area was previously used by the past Viceroy of Canada, John Campbell, 9th Duke of Argyll, and his wife, Princess Louise, the daughter of Queen Victoria.

Lansdowne proved himself an adept statesman in helping to negotiate a settlement of a dispute between Canada and the United States in 1886–1887 over fishing rights. He was able to get a new trade agreement accepted by President Grover Cleveland but it was later rejected by the American Senate. He was also a supporter of scientific development and presided over the inaugural session of the British Association for the Advancement of Science in 1884. In Quebec, he was very popular, as he spoke french fluently, which gained him the admiration of French-Canadians, and a big round of applause during his first speech. His French came from his maternal grandfather, Count Charles de Flahaut, who had been a French general to Napoleon Bonaparte. Lord Lansdowne also made multiple speeches at the Citadelle of Quebec, near Château Frontenac, and joined the Montreal Winter Carnival, making him and his wife, the first vice-royal couple to skate at that event.

Lansdowne departed Canada "with its clear skies, its exhilarating sports, and within the bright fire of Gatineau logs, with our children and friends gathered round us" to his regret. He gave his wife a great deal of the credit for his success in Canada. One of her happiest and most successful endeavours at Rideau Hall was a party that she threw for 400 Sunday school children. Lady Lansdowne was decorated with the Order of Victoria and Albert and the Imperial Order of the Crown of India. Lord Lansdowne's military secretary, Lord Melgund, later became Lord Minto and served as Governor General between 1898 and 1904.

Viceroy of India, 1888–1894
Lord Lansdowne was appointed Viceroy of India the same year that he left Canada. The office, which he held from 1888 to 1894, was offered to him by the Conservative prime minister, Robert Gascoyne-Cecil, 3rd Marquess of Salisbury, and marked the pinnacle of his career. He worked to reform the army, police, local government and the mint. There was an Anglo-Manipur War in 1890 in which Manipur was subjugated. Lansdowne securing the death penalty for the instigator in the face of considerable opposition from Britain. His attempt in 1893 to curtail trial by jury was, however, overruled by home government. He returned to England in 1894. His policies exacerbated tensions between Hindu and Muslims.

Secretary of State for War, 1895–1900
Upon his return, as a Liberal Unionist, he aligned with the Conservative Party. Prime Minister Lord Salisbury appointed Lansdowne to the post of Secretary of State for War in June 1895. The unpreparedness of the British Army during the Second Boer War brought calls for Lansdowne's impeachment in 1899. His biographer, P. B. Waite, considers that he was unjustly criticised for British military failures, but ever the good minister, he took full responsibility and said nothing.

Secretary of State for Foreign Affairs, 1900–1905

After the Unionist victory in the general election of October 1900, Salisbury reorganised his cabinet, gave up the post of Foreign Secretary and appointed Lansdowne to replace him. Lansdowne remained at the Foreign Office under Salisbury's successor Arthur Balfour. As British Foreign Secretary, he signed the 1902 Anglo-Japanese Alliance at his London home, the back half of which still exists as the Lansdowne Club, and negotiated the 1904 Anglo-French Entente Cordiale with French Foreign Minister Theophile Delcassé.
According to  G. W. Monger's summary of the Cabinet debates in 1900 to 1902:Chamberlain advocated ending Britain's isolation by concluding an alliance with Germany; Salisbury resisted change. With the new crisis in China caused by the Boxer rising and Landsdowne's appointment to the Foreign Office in 1900, those who advocated a change won the upper hand. Landsdowne in turn attempted to reach an agreement with Germany and a settlement with Russia but failed. In the end Britain concluded an alliance with Japan. The decision of 1901 was momentous; British policy had been guided by events, but Lansdowne had no real understanding of these events. The change of policy had been forced on him and was a confession of Britain's weakness.

Big Revolver
On 15 June 1903, he made a speech in the House of Lords defending fiscal retaliation against countries with high tariffs and governments subsidising products for sale in Britain (known as 'bounty-fed products', also called dumping). Retaliation was to be done by threatening to impose tariffs in response against that country's goods. His Liberal Unionists had split from the Liberals, who promoted Free Trade, and the speech was a landmark in the group's slide towards protectionism. Landsdowne argued that threatening retaliatory tariffs was similar to getting respect in a room of armed men by showing a big revolver (his exact words were "a rather larger revolver than everybody else's"). The "Big Revolver" became a catchphrase of the day and was often used in speeches and cartoons.

Unionist leader in Lords

In 1903, Lord Lansdowne became the leader of Unionists (Conservative and Liberal Unionist peers) in the House of Lords. This was followed shortly by the Liberal victory in the January 1906 general elections. In his new role as head of the opposition peers, he was instrumental in the Unionist leader Arthur Balfour's plans to obstruct Liberal policies through the Unionist majority in the upper house. Although he and Balfour had some misgivings, he led the Lords to reject the People's Budget of 1909. After the Liberals won two elections in 1910 on the pledge to reform the House of Lords and to remove its veto power and after a series of failed negotiations in which Lansdowne was of key importance, the Liberals moved forward to end the Lords veto, if necessary by recommending to the King to create hundreds of new Liberal peers. Lansdowne and the other Conservative leaders were anxious to prevent such an action by allowing the bill, distasteful as they found it, to pass, but soon, Lansdowne found that he could not count on many of the more reactionary peers, who planned on a last-ditch resistance. Ultimately, enough Unionist peers either (like Lansdowne himself) abstained from the vote ("hedgers") or even voted for the bill ("rats") to ensure its passage into the Parliament Act 1911.

In the following years, Lansdowne continued as Opposition Leader in the Lords, his stature increasing when Balfour, the party leader in the Commons, resigned and was replaced by the inexperienced Bonar Law, who had never held cabinet office. In 1914, the suffragettes Flora Drummond and Norah Dacre Fox (later known as Norah Elam) besieged Lansdowne's home and argued that Ulster'z incitement to militancy had passed without notice, but suffragettes were charged and imprisoned. In 1915, Lansdowne joined the wartime coalition cabinet of H. H. Asquith as a Minister without Portfolio but was not given a post in the Lloyd George government formed the following year, despite Conservative pre-eminence in that government. In 1917, having discussed the idea with colleagues for some time with no response, he published the controversial "Lansdowne Letter", which called for a statement of postwar intentions from the Entente Powers. He was criticised as acting contrary to cabinet policy.

Death 
Lord Lansdowne died at Clonmel, Ireland on 3 June 1927 at the age of 82. The Marchioness died in 1932, and their tombs are in the churchyard at Derry Hill, near their Bowood estate in Wiltshire.

Family

Henry Petty-FitzMaurice married Lady Maud Evelyn Hamilton, a daughter of James Hamilton, 1st Duke of Abercorn, and his wife Lady Louisa Jane Russell, V.A., daughter of John, 6th Duke of Bedford in 1869. The couple went to Canada in October 1883 with their niece Lady Florence Anson (Streatfield) and their children:
Lady Evelyn Emily Mary Petty-Fitzmaurice (27 August 18702 April 1960), married Victor Cavendish, 9th Duke of Devonshire.
Henry William Edmund Petty-Fitzmaurice, 6th Marquess of Lansdowne (14 January 18725 March 1936), was cousin of Charles Spencer-Churchill, 9th Duke of Marlborough, cousin of Winston Churchill and husband of Consuelo Vanderbilt.
Lord Charles George Francis Petty-Fitzmaurice (12 February 187430 October 1914), his widow, Baroness Violet Astor, remarried to John Jacob Astor V.
Lady Beatrix Frances Petty-Fitzmaurice (25 March 18775 August 1953), married firstly Henry Beresford, 6th Marquess of Waterford and secondly Osborne Beauclerk, 12th Duke of St Albans.

Honorific eponyms

Geographic locations:
  The town of Lansdowne in India
  Ontario: Lansdowne Avenue, Toronto
  Ontario: Lansdowne Street, Sudbury
  Ontario: Lansdowne Park, Ottawa
  Ontario: Lansdowne Street, Peterborough
  Ontario: Lansdowne Avenue, Sarnia
  New Brunswick: Lansdowne Street, Campbellton
  New Brunswick: Lansdowne Street, Fredericton
  Quebec: (Upper) Lansdowne Avenue, Westmount
  Saskatchewan: Lansdowne Avenue, Imperial
 : Mount Lansdowne, Yukon 
  Lansdowne Road, Kolkata, India.
  Lansdowne, Nova Scotia
  British Columbia:Lansdowne Road, Saanich

Schools:
  Ontario: Lansdowne Public School, Sudbury
  Ontario: Lord Lansdowne Public School, Toronto
  Manitoba: Lansdowne Public School, Winnipeg
  Ontario: Lansdowne Public School, Sarnia

Bridges:
  Lansdowne Bridge, Lansdowne, New South Wales, Australia – a bridge built in 1834–1835 and has the largest span of all Australian masonry bridges
  Lansdowne Bridge, Rohri, Sindh, Pakistan – a rigid girder bridge built 1879–1887 used by railway traffic

Buildings:
  Lansdowne Building, Mysore, Karnataka, India, c. 1892 – a market being repaired and restored after a partial collapse in 2012
  Lansdowne Court, Kolkata, India – residential development
  Lansdowne Hall, Cooch Behar, India – Community Hall, Library, Masonic Purposes. now Cooch Behar District Magistrate's Office

Market:
  Lansdowne Market, Kolkata, India.

Station:
 Lansdowne (TTC), Toronto
 Lansdowne station (SkyTrain), Vancouver

Education:
 McGill University, Montreal, 1884, honorific Doctor of law

References

Further reading
 Cohen, Avner. "Joseph Chamberlain, Lord Lansdowne and British Foreign Policy 1901–1903: From Collaboration to Confrontation". Australian Journal of Politics and History  43.2 (1997): 122+.
 
 Gooch, G. P. Before the war: studies in diplomacy (vol 1 1936) pp. 1–86. online scholarly biography of Lansdowne, stressing foreign policy.
 Grenville, J. A. S. "Lansdowne's Abortive Project of 12 March 1901 for a Secret Agreement with Germany". Bulletin of the Institute of Historical Research  27#76 (November 1954): 201–213. 
 Grenville, John Ashley Soames. "Great Britain and the Isthmian Canal, 1898–1901." American Historical Review 61.1 (1955): 48-69. online
 Jeshurun, Chandran. "Lord Lansdowne and the 'Anti-German Clique' at the Foreign Office: Their Role in the Making of the Anglo-Siamese Agreement of 1902." Journal of Southeast Asian Studies 3.2 (1972): 229–246 online.
 Keohane, Nigel. The Party of Patriotism: The Conservative Party and the First World War (Routledge, 2016).
 Kerry, Simon. Lansdowne: The Last Great Whig (2018), scholarly biography. Online review (Wall Street Journal).
 Kurtz, Harold. "The Lansdowne Letter, November 1917". History Today Vol. 18, No. 2 (February 1968): 84–92
 McKercher, B. J. C. "Diplomatic Equipoise: The Lansdowne Foreign Office The Russo-Japanese War of 1904–1905, and The Global Balance of Power". Canadian Journal of History 24.3 (1989): 299–340.
 Massie, Robert K. Dreadnought: Britain, Germany, and the coming of the Great War (Random House, 1991) excerpt see Dreadnought (book), popular history; pp. 337–350.
 Monger, George W. "The End of Isolation: Britain, Germany and Japan, 1900–1902" Transactions of the Royal Historical Society 13 (1963): 103–121. online
 Monger, George. The End of Isolation; British Foreign Policy, 1900–1907 (Nelson, 1963).
 Mulligan, William. "From Case to Narrative: The Marquess of Lansdowne, Sir Edward Grey, and the Threat from Germany, 1900–1906." International History Review 30.2 (2008): 273–302.
 Newton, Douglas. "The Lansdowne 'Peace Letter' of 1917 and the Prospect of Peace by Negotiation with Germany". Australian Journal of Politics & History 48.1 (2002): pp. 16–39.
 Newton, Lord. Lord Lansdowne: A Biography (Macmillan, 1929) online.

 Winters, Frank Winfield. "Gentlemen's diplomacy: the foreign policy of Lord Lansdowne, 1845–1927". (PhD Diss. Texas A & M University, 2006) online.

External links

 
 
1903 World's Work illustrated article with photo of Petty-Fitzmaurice

Viceroys of India
1880s in British India
1890s in British India
Governors General of Canada
1845 births
1927 deaths
Knights Grand Commander of the Order of the Star of India
Knights Grand Commander of the Order of the Indian Empire
Knights Grand Cross of the Order of St Michael and St George
Knights of the Garter
Leaders of the Conservative Party (UK)
Liberal Party (UK) hereditary peers
Lord-Lieutenants of Wiltshire
Members of the Privy Council of the United Kingdom
Politicians from London
British Secretaries of State for Foreign Affairs
Liberal Unionist Party peers
Leaders of the House of Lords
Presidents of the Marylebone Cricket Club
5
Henry
Earls of Kerry